is a former Japanese voice actress and child actress from Saitama Prefecture, Japan.

As of 2016, she has indefinite hiatus.

Filmography

Anime
2008
 Michiko to Hatchin (Marisa (episode 5))
2009
 Yumeiro Patissiere (Caramel)
2010
 Shiki (Shizuka Matsuo)
 Yumeiro Patissiere SP Professional (Caramel)
2011
 Bunny Drop (Sayaka (episodes 9-11))
2012
 Jormungand (Malka (episode 5))
 Jormungand: Perfect Order (Malka)
2014
 Mushi-Shi -Next Passage- (Mizuho)

Theatrical animation
 The Disappearance of Haruhi Suzumiya (Girl)
 Welcome to the Space Show (Ink)
 The Wind Rises (Naoko Satomi (young))

Dubbing roles
 Oz the Great and Powerful (China Girl (Joey King))

References

External links
 

1999 births
Living people
Japanese child actresses
Japanese voice actresses
Voice actresses from Saitama Prefecture